Peter Manfred Gruber (28 August 1941, Klagenfurt – 7 March 2017, Vienna) was an Austrian mathematician working in geometric number theory as well as in convex and discrete geometry.

Biography

Gruber obtained his PhD at the University of Vienna in 1966, under the supervision of Nikolaus Hofreiter. From 1971, he was Professor at the University of Linz, and from 1976, at the TU Wien. He was a member of the Austrian Academy of Sciences, a foreign member of the Russian Academy of Sciences, and a corresponding member of the Bavarian Academy of Sciences and Humanities.

His past doctoral students include Monika Ludwig.

Selected publications

Decorations and awards
 1967: Prize of the Austrian Mathematical Society
 1978, 1980 and 1982: Chairman of the Austrian Mathematical Society
 1991: Full member of the Austrian Academy of Sciences (Corresponding member since 1988)
 1996: Medal of the Union of Czech Mathematicians and Physicists
 2001: Austrian Cross of Honour for Science and Art, 1st class
 2001: Medal of the mathematical and physical faculty of Charles University in Prague
 2003: Foreign member of the Russian Academy of Sciences
 2008: Grand Silver Medal for Services to the Republic of Austria
 2013: Fellow of the American Mathematical Society, for "contributions to the geometry of numbers and to convex and discrete geometry".
 Honorary doctorates from the Universities of Siegen, Turin and Salzburg
 Member of the Academies of Sciences in Messina and Modena
 Corresponding member of the Bavarian Academy of Sciences

Notes

1941 births
2017 deaths
Scientists from Klagenfurt
Austrian mathematicians
Geometers
Number theorists
University of Vienna alumni
Academic staff of Johannes Kepler University Linz
Academic staff of TU Wien
Foreign Members of the Russian Academy of Sciences
Members of the Austrian Academy of Sciences
Recipients of the Austrian Cross of Honour for Science and Art, 1st class
Recipients of the Grand Decoration for Services to the Republic of Austria
Fellows of the American Mathematical Society